Hoshiyar… Sahi Waqt, Sahi Kadam is an  Indian Hindi crime reality television anthology series, which is Aired on 24 December 2016 and Currently broadcast on &TV. The series will be produced by Optimystix Entertainment of Vipul D. Shah. The series will be aired on weekends' nights. The series will be hosted by Mohnish Bahl.

Host
Mohnish Bahl(2016-2017)

Cast 
 Keval Vora as Punit(episode 17)
 Akshay Batchu as Arnub(episode 17)
 Jai Thakker as Deepak(episode 17)
 Bhavin Bhanushali (episode 16)

References

External links
 Official website
 Hoshiyar… Sahi Waqt, Sahi Kadam on ZEE5

2016 Indian television series debuts
Hindi-language television shows
Indian crime television series
Indian reality television series
Television shows set in Mumbai
&TV original programming
Indian anthology television series
2017 Indian television series endings
Television series by Optimystix Entertainment